Aziz Sahmaoui (in Arabic: عزيز السحماوي) (born 1962 in Marrakesh) is a Moroccan musician (vocalist – percussionist) specialized in the modern Gnawa music.

Early life
Aziz Sahmaoui was born in 1962 in Marrakesh and grew up in the red city. He started listening to Gnawa music since his young age, influenced by his father. After finishing his studies, he moved by the 1990s to Paris where he co-founded the National Orchestra of Barbès (in French: l'Orchestre National de Barbès – ONB), which mixed Reggae and Raï with North African influences.

After releasing two albums with ONB, he joined the pianist Joe Zawinul and collaborated with him in a number of songs. In 2010, Sahmaoui founded his own band, The University of Gnawa, having members from various countries including France, Senegal and North Africa. Inspired by its founder's experience, the band shows traces of many genres: North African Paris, ethno-Jazz Fusion, Raï, Chaabi and traditional West African music. Its core curriculum remains though: The deep exploration of Gnawa trance music. His first album was produced in Paris by Martin Meissonnier. Since, the band has toured all over the world, including the USA.

In 2014, Aziz Sahmaoui applied for the Algerian citizenship, saying that: “I’d love to be an Algerian Citizen. It would be such an honor for me. Maybe this is a right, but it will be a joy, a privilege, an honor to be an Algerian citizen.”.

Discography
During his career, Aziz Sahmaoui recorded several albums, including:
 Poetic Trance (2019) – With University of Gnawa
 Mazal (2014) – With University of Gnawa
 University of Gnawa (2011)  – With University of Gnawa
 75 (2008)  – With Joe Zawinul

References

1962 births
People from Marrakesh
20th-century Moroccan male singers
North African music
Living people
21st-century Moroccan male singers